Megasis noctileucella is a species of snout moth in the genus Megasis. It was described by Ragonot in 1887, and is known from Armenia.

References

Moths described in 1887
Phycitini